"Never as Good as the First Time" is a song by English band Sade from their second studio album, Promise (1985). It was released as the album's third single and contained a vocal intro not included on the original album version, as well as a slightly different vocal mix. The song reached number 8 on the Billboard R&B Singles chart and number 20 on the US Billboard Hot 100.

Reception
Frank Guan of Vulture stated, "Nearly all Sade songs are about commitment and security, but this, an ode to hooking up and living purely in the present, is the exception. The reckless pace matches the lyrical abandon. It's no accident that the music video is mostly just Sade racing a horse across open country, which is so great that it’s tempting to replace the Internet entirely with GIFs of Sade racing a horse across open country."

Music video

The black-and-white music video for "Never as Good as the First Time" features Sade Adu riding a horse through the towns of El Rocío, Almonte, and Huelva in Andalusia, Spain.

Track listings
7-inch single
A. "Never as Good as the First Time" (Remix Edit) – 3:57
B. "Keep Hanging On" (Live Instrumental) – 2:59

US, Canadian and Japanese 7-inch single
A. "Never as Good as the First Time" (Remix Edit) – 3:57
B. "Keep Hanging On" (Live Instrumental) – 2:59

12-inch single
A. "Never as Good as the First Time" (Extended Mix) – 5:06
B. "Keep Hanging On" (Live Instrumental) – 2:59

US, Canadian and Japanese 12-inch single
A. "Never as Good as the First Time" (Extended Remix) – 5:12
B. "Keep Hanging On" (Live Instrumental) – 2:59

Charts

References

1985 songs
1986 singles
Black-and-white music videos
Epic Records singles
Portrait Records singles
Sade (band) songs
Song recordings produced by Mike Pela
Songs written by Sade (singer)
Songs written by Stuart Matthewman